Khawar Mehmood Qureshi  is a British barrister and international lawyer. He is known for his involvement in numerous high-profile cases, including the recent cases of Philomena Mwilu and Kulbhushan Jadhav.

In 2013, he was appointed a deputy High Court judge, specializing in civil and commercial disputes. He has appeared in the English courts, as well as complex international arbitration and commercial matters for and against more than sixty governments, including the USA, Russian Federation, India, Kazakhstan and Uganda. From 2010-2015, he was Chairman of The City UK Legal Services Group. During his career he has undertaken extensive pro bono work and advised leading charities such as UNICEF and War Child (charity).

Early life
He was born in England to a Pakistani family.

Appointments 

In August 1998, he was appointed as a member, and then Vice Chairman of the Bar Council's international relations committee and appointed thereafter the chairman of the public international law committee. In 2010, he became Chairman of The City UK Legal Services and Dispute Resolution Group. In 2013, he was appointed as a Deputy Judge of the High Court.

From 1999-2006 before taking Silk he was one of  around 20 UK Government "A" Panel Treasury Counsel advising and representing the Government on hundreds of constitutional issues and, (pursuant to the highest level of security clearance), many sensitive cases.

Academic appointments and publications 

He taught Commercial Law part-time at the University of Cambridge from 1989-93. He was appointed Visiting Lecturer in Public International Law at King's College London (1995-02). He was appointed a Visiting Professor in Commercial Law, London University in 2006–2013.
He is a Member (Commercial and International Law) of Halsbury's Law Exchange.

Practice areas 
His main areas of practice are Commercial Litigation, International Arbitration, Public International Law, Judicial Review and Regulatory matters. In 1993, he was the then youngest lawyer to appear before the International Court of Justice, representing Bosnia in the genocide case against Yugoslavia.

References 

Members of the Middle Temple
British legal writers
Lawyers from London
Living people
Year of birth missing (living people)
British barristers
Alumni of the University of Cambridge
Academics of King's College London
Academics of the University of Cambridge
British people of Pakistani descent
21st-century King's Counsel
British King's Counsel